Wrist Slitter is the third solo album by The New Amsterdams and The Get Up Kids frontman Matt Pryor. The album was released on Max Bemis's Rory Records imprint for Equal Vision Records in the US, Arctic Rodeo in Europe and Alcopop! Records in the UK.

Track listing

Personnel
Matt Pryor - Vocals, Guitar, Percussion, Piano, Production
Steve Soboslai - Vocals on "Words Get In The Way"
Bob Nanna - Vocals on "Before My Tongue Becomes a Sword"
Chris Conley - Vocals on "Before My Tongue Becomes a Sword"
Ed Rose - Production

References

Matt Pryor (musician) albums
2013 albums
Alcopop! Records albums